Amundsen is a large lunar impact crater located near the south pole of the Moon, named after the Norwegian explorer Roald Amundsen. It lies along the southern lunar limb, and so is viewed from the side by an observer on the Earth. To the northwest is the crater Scott, a formation of similar dimensions that is named for another Antarctic explorer. Nobile is attached to the western rim.

The rim of Amundsen is slightly distended along the southern edge, and the terraced inner surface is wider at that point than elsewhere along the outer wall. The crater overlaps a smaller crater formation to the northwest, and Amundsen A is attached to the northern rim. Just to the south of Amundsen is the smaller crater Faustini.

The inner floor is relatively flat, with a pair of central peaks near the midpoint. Much of the crater floor is cloaked in shadow during the lunar day, with only the southern floor and the central peaks receiving sunlight.

Amundsen Crater hosts 82 square kilometers of carbon dioxide cold traps, where temperatures remain below ,  potentially containing solid carbon dioxide. Such areas could be high-priority target sites for future landed missions.

Satellite craters 

By convention these features are identified on lunar maps by placing the letter on the side of the crater midpoint that is closest to Amundsen.

The crater formerly named Amundsen A is now known as Hédervári.

See also 
 1065 Amundsenia, Mars-crossing asteroid

References

External links
 

Impact craters on the Moon